Marvin Weiss (born 7 March 1995) is a German footballer who plays as a midfielder.

Career
Weiss made his professional debut for VfB Stuttgart II in the 3. Liga on 21 February 2015, coming on as a substitute in the 89th minute for Sercan Sararer in the 4–1 home win against Sonnenhof Großaspach.

References

External links
 Profile at DFB.de
 Profile at kicker.de
 Marvin Weiss at FuPa

1995 births
Living people
Footballers from Stuttgart
German footballers
Germany youth international footballers
Association football midfielders
VfB Stuttgart II players
SC Freiburg II players
FV Illertissen players
Stuttgarter Kickers players
3. Liga players
Regionalliga players